The Pitcairn PA-1 Fleetwing  (Pitcairn Aviation - One)  is the first biplane designed for air racing and commercial airmail service by Pitcairn Aircraft Company.

Design
The Fleetwing biplane featured three cockpits capable carrying four revenue sightseeing passengers. The fuselage used (square and round) steel tubing with fabric covering. The squarish fuselage featured a slanted radiator on the front of the lower cowling

Operational history
The prototype PA-1 crashed after a flight with the control cables rigged backwards. A second aircraft was built shortly afterward.

Specifications (Pitcairn PA-1 Fleetwing)

References

PA-01
Single-engined tractor aircraft
1920s United States mailplanes
Biplanes
Aircraft first flown in 1925